Lucha Libre AAA Worldwide (AAA) is a professional wrestling promotion based in Mexico City. Former employees in AAA consist of professional wrestlers, managers, play-by-play and color commentators, announcers, interviewers, and referees.

List of AAA alumni

Male wrestlers

Female wrestlers

Footnotes

See also
List of Lucha Libre AAA Worldwide personnel
List of professional wrestlers

External links
AAAwrestling.com (official website)

Alumni
Lucha Libre AAA Worldwide alumni